Walkden Low Level railway station served the town of Walkden, City of Salford, Greater Manchester, England.

History
The station was opened as "Walkden" in 1875 by the London and North Western Railway on its new line from Roe Green Junction to Bolton Great Moor Street. It was renamed Walkden Low Level to distinguish it from the nearby ex-Lancashire and Yorkshire Railway's Walkden High Level station in June 1924. The station had two platforms reached by four ramps with waiting rooms and canopy on each, and offices on the north side. The railway company proposed naming the station "Walkden Stocks" but was overruled by the Local Board. Regular passenger services ceased in 1954 but the line continued to be used for freight traffic for some further time.

The station was about one mile north of Roe Green and close by there were sidings and a connection to the Bridgewater Estates colliery railway at Barrack's Tramway Junction.

References

Bibliography

External links
 The station and its history via Disused Stations UK
 The station on a 1948 OS map via npe maps
 The station on an 1885 series OS map overlay via National Library of Scotland
 The station and line via railwaycodes

Disused railway stations in Salford
Former London and North Western Railway stations
Railway stations in Great Britain opened in 1875
Railway stations in Great Britain closed in 1954